San Isidro High School is a public high school located in the unincorporated community of San Isidro, Texas, USA and classified as a 1A school by the UIL.  It is a part of the San Isidro Independent School District located in extreme northeastern Starr County. In 2015, the school was rated "Met Standard" by the Texas Education Agency.

Academics

State Titles
UIL Academic Meet Champions -
1991(1A)
UIL Calculator Applications -
1992(1A), 2008(1A)
UIL Number Sense -
1991(1A)
UIL Social Studies -
2008(1A), 2010(1A)
UIL Spelling & Vocabulary -
1993(1A), 1994(1A), 1996(1A)
UIL Journalism -
2017 (2A), 2019 (2A)

Athletics
The San Isidro Tigers compete in these sports -

Basketball, Cross Country, Track & Field, and Volleyball

References

External links
San Isidro ISD website

Public high schools in Texas
Schools in Starr County, Texas